Simeon Smith House may refer to:
Simeon P. Smith House, Portsmouth, New Hampshire, listed on the U.S. National Register of Historic Places (NRHP)
 Simeon Smith House (West Haven, Vermont), listed on the NRHP in Rutland County, Vermont
Simeon Smith Mansion, West Haven, Vermont, listed on the NRHP in Rutland County, Vermont

See also
Smith House